Snap-On Gearhead Garage: The Virtual Mechanic is a PC game where players repair and customize late model cars and trucks.  It was created by Mekada, endorsed by Snap-on Tools, and published in 1999 by Head Games (subsequently acquired by Activision).  There is no feature for driving the cars but Gearhead Garage introduced an entirely new "bolt-em up" paradigm.  The appeal is reminiscent of taking things apart in real life—players can completely disassemble the engine, repair the individual parts, reassemble them, and then exhibit the completed result in their 3D "car lot".  The game also features a series of "jobs", wherein the player fixes vehicles owned by fictional characters.  This allows them to earn money to buy custom items from the catalog, auction, or junkyard.

Popularity
Gearhead Garage sold surprisingly well given its unusual design.  It received generally excellent reviews, for example an average score of 4.5 out of 5 stars at Amazon.com and 9.5 out of 10 points at ReviewCentre.com. The  GearheadGarage web site attracted a community of enthusiastic fans who eventually reverse-engineered the game file formats and began creating entirely new vehicles using tools such as 3D Studio Max.  In all, the community contributed over 30 complete car models that can be downloaded from various 3rd party web sites dedicated to the game.

Gearhead Garage's constructive, non-violent gameplay made it popular with parents and educators as well.  In 2002, it received an "All Star Award" from Children's Software Review magazine in the "Logic" category.

Gearhead Garage 2

There was originally talk about making a Gearhead Garage 2 game, but according to sources within the company, no publishers were willing to put up the money for it. There was thought of becoming their own independent publisher but more information on that is unavailable at the moment.

Nintendo Game Boy Advance

Mekada has currently got a playable demo out for what was going to be Gearhead Garage Adventure released onto the GBA, but due to the DS coming out and pricing issues with Nintendo's cartridges, this was later dropped.

References

External links
 Gearhead Garage official web site
 Mekada web site

Video games developed in the United States
Windows games
Windows-only games
1999 video games